Mark James is a retired New Zealand rower. He won medals with the men's eight at the 1978 (bronze) and 1979 World Rowing Championships (silver). James is now active as a rowing trainer.

References

Year of birth missing (living people)
Living people
New Zealand male rowers
World Rowing Championships medalists for New Zealand